Following table consists name of Safavid dynasty monarchs in Iran.

List of Safavid monarchs

See also
 Safavid dynasty family tree
 List of the mothers of the Safavid Shahs

References

Safavid